Lukman Niode (21 October 1963 – 17 April 2020) was an Indonesian swimmer. He competed in numerous domestic and international events including three events at the 1984 Summer Olympics, but was eliminated in the heats in all three events.

Lukman died on 17 April 2020 in Pelni Hospital in Jakarta at the age of 56, due to COVID-19 during the pandemic.

References

External links
 

1963 births
2020 deaths
Indonesian male swimmers
Olympic swimmers of Indonesia
Swimmers at the 1984 Summer Olympics
Sportspeople from Jakarta
Asian Games medalists in swimming
Asian Games bronze medalists for Indonesia
Swimmers at the 1978 Asian Games
Swimmers at the 1982 Asian Games
Swimmers at the 1986 Asian Games
Medalists at the 1978 Asian Games
Medalists at the 1982 Asian Games
Medalists at the 1986 Asian Games
Southeast Asian Games medalists in swimming
Southeast Asian Games gold medalists for Indonesia
Southeast Asian Games silver medalists for Indonesia
Southeast Asian Games bronze medalists for Indonesia
Competitors at the 1977 Southeast Asian Games
Deaths from the COVID-19 pandemic in Indonesia
20th-century Indonesian people